Robert Emmett Tansey (June 28, 1897 – June 17, 1951) was an American actor, screenwriter, film producer and director. He was active in cinema in various roles from the 1910s to the 1950s. He was sometimes credited as Robert E. Tansey or Robert Tansey.

Selected filmography
 Riding to Fame (1927)
 Romance of the West (1930)
 Riders of the Rio (1931)
 The Way of the West (1934)
 Badge of Honor (1934)
 Paradise Canyon (1935)
 Courage of the North (1935)
 Timber Terrors (1935)
 Westward Ho (1935)
 Song of the Gringo (1936)
 Pinto Rustlers (1936)
 Where Trails Divide (1937)
 Riders of the Dawn (1937)
 The Painted Trail (1938)
 Man from Texas (1939)
 Overland Mail (1939)
Across the Plains (1939), producer and screenwriter
 Take Me Back to Oklahoma (1940)
 The Golden Trail (1940)
 Lone Star Law Men (1941)
Dynamite Canyon (1941)
 Silver Stallion (1941)
 The Pioneers (1941)
The Driftin' Kid (1941)
 Western Mail (1942)
 Texas to Bataan (1942)
 Trail Riders (1942)
 Where Trails End (1942)
 Two Fisted Justice (1943)
Death Valley Rangers (1943)
 Harmony Trail (1944)
 Song of Old Wyoming (1945)
 Romance of the West (1946)
 The Caravan Trail (1946)
 Colorado Serenade (1946)
 Tumbleweed Trail (1946)
 Driftin' River (1946)
 Stars Over Texas (1946)
 Wild West (1946)
 The Enchanted Valley (1948)
 Shaggy (1948)
 Forbidden Jungle (1950)
 The Fighting Stallion (1950)
 Federal Man (1950)
 Cattle Queen (1951)
 Badman's Gold (1951)

References

Bibliography
 Michael R. Pitts. Poverty Row Studios, 1929–1940: An Illustrated History of 55 Independent Film Companies, with a Filmography for Each. McFarland & Company, 2005.

External links

Robert Emmett Tansey — Old Corral (Chuck Anderson)

1897 births
1951 deaths
Film producers from New York (state)
Screenwriters from New York (state)
American male film actors
People from Brooklyn
Film directors from New York City
20th-century American male actors
20th-century American screenwriters